U Saved Me is a gospel song by R. Kelly.  Taken as the title track single from U Saved Me (a part of the Happy People/U Saved Me double disc album), it reached number 52 on the Billboard Hot 100 and number 14 on the Hot R&B and Hip-Hop Songs charts. The song later appeared on Kelly's 2010 album, Epic.

Music video
The music video was directed by Little X under his real name, Julien Christian Lutz.

Live performance
Kelly sang this song live for the first time at the 2005  Soul Train Awards Show.

Song content
Kelly narrates four real-life stories based on trials and tribulations of individuals and how they turned it over to God so that He can save them.  The first verse describes a drunk driver who nearly lost his life in a car accident, the second verse describes a person on unemployment and has trouble looking for work, the third verse describes an 18-year-old drug dealer who was involved in a shootout when a drug deal went bad, and the fourth verse describes a person diagnosed with cancer who reached out to his mother to pray for him.  In each situation, they were thankful to be given a second chance at life.

Charts

Year-end charts

Cover versions
 Trin-i-tee 5:7 covered the song on their album T57, released in 2007.

Release history

References

2004 singles
R. Kelly songs
Songs written by R. Kelly
Song recordings produced by R. Kelly
2004 songs
Jive Records singles
2000s ballads